is a shoot'em up game was released for Mobile Phones and was Developed and Published by Konami on May 25, 2003, in Japan only.

External links 
 Star Devastator at Konami Japan (in Japanese)

Mobile games
Shoot 'em ups
2003 video games
Japan-exclusive video games
Konami games
Video games developed in Japan